Maksym Valeriyovych Banasevych (born 31 January 1995) is a Ukrainian professional footballer who plays as a midfielder for FC Continentals.

Career

Early career 
Banasevych is a product of several different youth academies around Kyiv. He would sign his first professional contract with FC Obolon Kyiv in 2012. He primarily saw action in the Ukrainian Second League with Obolon's reserve squad. The following season he was transferred to FC Zorya Luhansk due to the financial issues Obolon experienced at the conclusion of the season.

Desna Chernihiv 
In his debut season with Zorya, he managed to make two appearances in the 2014–15 Ukrainian Cup. After failing to break into the senior team he was loaned out to FC Desna Chernihiv in the Ukrainian First League. He ultimately signed a permanent deal with Chernihiv after becoming a free agent in 2017. In his second season in the second tier, he made 18 appearances and recorded 3 goals. He helped Chernihiv secure promotion to the Ukrainian Premier League during his third season with the club. The following season he re-signed with Chernihiv and made his debut in the country's top tier.

First League 
After making 11 appearances in the premier league he made a return to the second tier by being loaned to Kolos Kovalivka. After the conclusion of the season, his contract with Desna was terminated. In 2019, he remained in the first league to sign with Rukh Lviv. His tenure with the western Ukrainian club was brief as he secured a move to Metalist 1925 Kharkiv. After a season in Kharkiv, his contract was terminated on mutual terms. 

In 2020, he landed in the third tier by signing with Dinaz Vyshhorod in 2020. Following his two-year stint with Dinaz, he secured a deal with FC Livyi Bereh Kyiv.

Canada 
In the summer of 2022, he played abroad in southern Ontario in the Canadian Soccer League with FC Continentals. Throughout the season he helped the club secure a postseason berth by finishing fourth in the standings. He featured in the CSL Championship final where the Continentals defeated Scarborough SC for the title.

Honours
Dinaz Vyshhorod
 Ukrainian Second League: Runner-Up 2020–21

Rukh Lviv
 Ukrainian First League: 2019–20

Kolos Kovalivka
 Ukrainian First League: 2018–19

Desna Chernihiv
 Ukrainian First League: 2017–18

References

External links
 Profile at FC Dinaz 
 
 
 

1995 births
Living people
Footballers from Kyiv
Ukrainian footballers
Ukraine student international footballers
Ukraine youth international footballers
FC Obolon-2 Kyiv players
FC Obolon-Brovar Kyiv players
FC Zorya Luhansk players
FC Desna Chernihiv players
FC Kolos Kovalivka players
FC Rukh Lviv players
FC Metalist 1925 Kharkiv players
FC Dinaz Vyshhorod players
FC Continentals players
Association football midfielders
21st-century Ukrainian people
Ukrainian Premier League players
Ukrainian First League players
Ukrainian Second League players
Canadian Soccer League (1998–present) players